Campbell-Jordan House, also known as the Campbell-Jordan-Lindsey-Farnell House, is a historic residence in Washington, Georgia. It was added to the National Register of Historic Places on July 14, 1971. It is located at 208 Liberty Street.

The Federal architecture-style home was built in 1787 and underwent a Greek Revival architecture-style makeover in 1841, including the addition of large columns. The original cottage was built by William Stith after 1787 and was bought in 1807 by Duncan Campbell who enlarged it. The western part of the structure was likely built by Judge Albert Gallatin Semmes. In 1841, Aaron A. Cleveland added the colonnade. The home was the residence of U.S. Supreme Court Justice and C.S.A. Assistant Secretary of War, John Archibald Campbell.

See also

National Register of Historic Places listings in Wilkes County, Georgia

References

Houses on the National Register of Historic Places in Georgia (U.S. state)
Houses completed in 1787
Federal architecture in Georgia (U.S. state)
Greek Revival houses in Georgia (U.S. state)
Houses in Wilkes County, Georgia
1787 establishments in Georgia (U.S. state)
National Register of Historic Places in Wilkes County, Georgia